The 100 Best Female Footballers in the World is an annual global ranking of the best female footballers. The list was started by The Offside Rule podcast in 2016. Since 2018 it has also been published in association with the British newspaper The Guardian who have published the male equivalent since its inception in 2012.

The list is voted for by a panel of experts ranging from players and coaches to journalists and broadcasters from around the world. Judges are sent a longlist of 450 footballers and asked to rank their top 40 who are given a corresponding points value. The total across all judges determines the finish position. In 2019, the panel consisted of 93 judges from 44 countries across five continents including newly-appointed USWNT and reigning NWSL champion head coach Vlatko Andonovski, and FIFA Female Player of the Century and legendary China international Sun Wen.

Winners 
Number of wins in brackets.

Top 10 
As of 2022, 31 individual players have been included in the "top 10" of the Top 100 list.

Overall

By nationality 
As of the 2022 edition, players from 37 nations have made up the Top 100. The United States has been the most represented nation in total (104) with a record 19 individuals in 2019. In 2020, Germany became the first nation other than the United States to be the most represented. Colombia and Haiti are the most recent nations to debut following the inclusion of Linda Caicedo and Melchie Dumornay in 2022.

Nationality is defined under FIFA eligibility rules. Players may hold more than one non-FIFA nationality.

Nationalities by continent 
Continent refers to the corresponding continental confederation of the player's nationality.

By club 
As of the 2022 edition, players playing for 84 different clubs have been selected. French club Lyon has had the most players in the Top 100 with 93 total selections. In 2022, Barcelona became the first club other than Lyon to have the most players selected in a single year. Clubs are counted when a player in the Top 100 played for that team in the same calendar year they were selected. Players may have played for multiple clubs per year.

Clubs by nation

See also
 List of sports awards honouring women
 The Guardian 100 Best Male Footballers in the World
 The Guardian Footballer of the Year
 FIFPro World11
 BBC Women's Footballer of the Year

References

The Guardian awards
Association football-related lists
Women's association football trophies and awards
Women's association football player of the year awards